is a  peak of the Sefuri Mountains, which are located on the border of Fukuoka, Fukuoka Prefecture, and Kanzaki, Saga Prefecture, Japan.

Outline
This mountain is the tallest peak of the Sefuri Mountain range between Fukuoka Prefecture and Saga Prefecture on the island of Kyūshū. Before the Meiji Restoration, this mountain was a center of the Shugendō religion in this region, along with Mount Hiko. Mount Sefuri is the location where the Buddhist priest Eisai first planted tea after his return to Japan from Song dynasty China in the Kamakura period.

Facilities
On the top of Mount Sefuri, there are two military sites. One is a radar site operated by the Japan Air Self-Defense Force, and the other is a communication station operated by the United States Air Force in Japan.

Routes
The most popular route to climb this mountain is from Shiiba Bus Stop of Nishitetsu Bus. It takes about from two and half hours to three hours to the top.

Gallery

References 
 Official Home Page of the Geographical Survey Institute in Japan
 Fukuoka no Yamayama

Sefuri
Sefuri